The AN/PSN-13 Defense Advanced GPS Receiver (DAGR; colloquially, "dagger") is a handheld GPS receiver used by the United States Department of Defense and select foreign military services. It is a military-grade, dual-frequency receiver, and has the security hardware necessary to decode the encrypted P(Y)-code GPS signals.

Manufactured by Rockwell Collins, the DAGR entered production in March 2004, with the 40,000th unit delivered in September 2005. It was estimated by the news source Defense Industry Daily that, by the end of 2006, the USA and various allies around the world had issued almost $300 million worth of DAGR contracts, and ordered almost 125,000 units. The DAGR replaced the Precision Lightweight GPS Receiver (PLGR), which was first fielded in 1994.

Rockwell Collins also manufactures a GPS receiver known as the "Polaris Guide", that looks like a DAGR, but uses only the civilian C/A code signals.  These units are labelled as "SPS", for "Standard Positioning Service", and may be possessed by non-military users.

Features
 Graphical screen, with the ability to overlay map images.
 12-channel continuous satellite tracking for "all-in-view" operation.
 Simultaneous L1/L2 dual frequency GPS signal reception.
 Capable of Direct-Y code acquisition
 Cold start first fix in less than 100 seconds.
 Extended performance in a diverse jamming environment.
 41 dB J/S maintaining state 5 tracking.
 24 dB during initial C/A code acquisition.
 Utilizes Receiver Autonomous Integrity Monitoring (RAIM).
 Selective Availability/Anti-Spoofing Module (SAASM) compatible (currently version 3.2).
 Wide Area GPS Enhancement (WAGE) compatible.
 Resistant to multi-path effects.
 Can be used as survey for weapons systems
 Fielded to the  U.S. Army, U.S. Marine Corps, U.S. Navy, U.S. Air Force and select foreign military forces
 Designed to fit in a Battle Dress Uniform's 2-magazine ammo pouch
 Approximate cost to government per unit to acquire: $1,832

Comparison to PLGR

References

External links 
 Rockwell Collins' DAGR technical specifications
 US Army DAGR information page
 Wikileaks' US Army AN/PSN-13A DAGR Operator's Manual -- Change 1
 Brooke Clarke's excellent DAGR Information Page

Global Positioning System
Military equipment of the United States
Military electronics of the United States
Military equipment introduced in the 2000s